The 1958 Giro di Lombardia, the 52nd edition of the race, was held on October 19, 1958.

General classification

Final general classification

References

1958
1958 in road cycling
1958 in Italian sport
1958 Challenge Desgrange-Colombo
October 1958 sports events in Europe